No. 146 Squadron RAF was a Royal Air Force Squadron formed as a fighter unit in India in World War II.

History
Plans for formation of the squadron in World War I never came to fruition. Upon arrival in Calcutta it was equipped with Hurricanes and flew missions over Burma. It converted to Thunderbolts before its disbandment in June 1945.

Aircraft operated

References

External links
 146 Squadron history on the official RAF website
 History of No.'s 146–150 Squadrons at RAF Web

146
Military units and formations established in 1918
1918 establishments in the United Kingdom